David Womark is an American film producer. With Ang Lee and Gil Netter, he was nominated for an Academy Award for his work on Life of Pi.
Life of Pi was also nominated for multiple Academy, BAFTA and Golden Globe awards including: Best Picture and Best Director and was an American Film Institute official selection for “best movie of the year”. Life of Pi emerged as a critical and commercial success, earning over US$609 million worldwide.

Womark, also served as Producer on Pete Berg's highly acclaimed "Deepwater Horizon" film: depicting the disaster in April 2010 when  the Deepwater Horizon offshore oil-rig exploded—resulting in the worst oil spill in American history.

"Peter Berg’s film dramatizes a familiar story and stands as a work of popular narrative for an age of corporate impunity..."
A.O. Scott/The NYTimes

References

External links

Living people
American film producers
Year of birth missing (living people)